Risa Ozaki was the defending champion, but chose to participate in Toronto instead.

Olivia Rogowska won the title, defeating Destanee Aiava in the final, 6–1, 6–2.

Seeds

Draw

Finals

Top half

Bottom half

References
Main Draw

Canberra Tennis International - Singles
2017 in Australian tennis
2017